Frances Temple (August 15, 1945 – July 5, 1995) was a primary school teacher, a writer of award-winning children's stories and young adult novels and illustrator. Her carefully researched novels focus on the political and economic travails of young people across the globe. Her works have dealt with poverty and oppression in contemporary El Salvador; two novels cover strife in contemporary Haiti; one is a retelling of a folk tale from Jamaica; and two novels—part of a projected trilogy—are set in the Middle Ages, in Spain and Morocco.

Biography 
Frances Nolting Temple was born August 15, 1945 in Washington, District of Columbia. She grew up in Virginia, France, and Vietnam, as the daughter of former U.S. ambassador to Vietnam Frederick Nolting, Jr. She served in the Peace Corps in Jamaica and Ethiopia from 1969–71. She died July 5, 1995 from a heart attack.

Awards and recognition
In 1993, Taste of Salt: A Story of Modern Haiti was awarded the Jane Addams Children's Book Award for a Book for Older Children.

Tonight, by Sea was the 1995 winner of The Americas Award, given by the Consortium of Latin American Studies Programs (CLASP).

The Frances Nolting Temple Prize for Teaching was established in 1996 at Hobart and William Smith Colleges "to recognize her dedication to teaching, children, and the human spirit."

Books 
 Frances Temple, Taste of Salt: A Story of Modern Haiti (1992)
 Frances Temple, Grab Hands and Run (1993)
 Charles A. Temple, Ruth Nathan, Frances Temple, The Beginnings of Writing (1993)
 Frances Temple, The Ramsay Scallop (1994)
 Frances Temple, Tiger Soup: An Anansi Story from Jamaica (1994)
 Frances Temple, Tonight, by Sea (1995) 
 Frances Temple, The Beduins' Gazelle (1996)

References

External links

 HarperCollins Publishers, Frances Temple
 

American writers of young adult literature
American children's writers
1945 births
1995 deaths
20th-century American women writers
20th-century American writers
Writers from Washington, D.C.